Louis Witten (born April 13, 1921) is an American theoretical physicist, centenarian and the father of the physicist Edward Witten.

Witten's research has centered on classical gravitation, including the discovery of certain exact electrovacuum solutions to the Einstein field equation. He edited a book (see citation below) which contains papers by contributors such as ADM (Arnowitt, Deser, and Misner), Choquet-Bruhat, Ehlers and Kundt, Goldberg, and Pirani which are used by researchers after the passage of more than 40 years. His most recent paper was published in 2020.

Early life and education
Louis Witten was born to a Jewish family in Baltimore, Maryland. His parents, Abraham Witten and Bessie Perman, emigrated to the United States from Eastern Europe as teenagers in 1909 and were married in 1916. Witten graduated as a Civil Engineer from Johns Hopkins University in 1941. From 1942 to 1946 he served in the US Army Air Forces as a Radar Weather Officer.

He was a graduate student in physics at The Johns Hopkins University from 1948 to 1951 when he received the PhD degree. His dissertation, in statistical mechanics, was entitled "A Model of an Imperfect Gas". His thesis advisor was Theodore H. Berlin. In 1949 he married Lorraine Wollach of Baltimore. They had four children, Edward, Celia, Matthew, and Jesse. Lorraine died in 1987. In 1992 he married Frances Lydia DeLange.

Academic career
After postdoctoral study at Princeton University, the University of Maryland, and the Lincoln Laboratory of MIT, Witten joined RIAS, the research laboratory of the Martin Marietta Corporation. In 1968 he became a Professor of Physics at the University of Cincinnati where he remained until his retirement in 1991. He is also emeritus at the University of Florida. Since 1968 he has been a Vice-President and Director of Science Affairs of the Gravity Research Foundation.

He participated in a conference held at the University of North Carolina at Chapel Hill from January 18–23, 1957 "to discuss the role of gravitation in physics".

Bibliography

Notes

References

Further reading
 

1921 births
Living people
21st-century American physicists
Jewish American scientists
Jewish physicists
Johns Hopkins University alumni
Martin Marietta people
Massachusetts Institute of Technology alumni
Princeton University alumni
University of Cincinnati faculty
University of Maryland, College Park alumni
MIT Lincoln Laboratory people
Fellows of the American Physical Society
United States Army Air Forces personnel of World War II
United States Army Air Forces officers
21st-century American Jews